Thomas White (March 19, 1739 – September 13, 1820) was an Irish American Patriot who took part in the Boston Tea Party, was a member of the Sons of Liberty, and served under General Washington in the American Revolution.

Early life
White was born in Kilkenny, Ireland, in 1739. Around 1771, he immigrated to Philadelphia, Pennsylvania. He was a tailor, and married Elizabeth Jones. They removed to Boston shortly thereafter, where White joined a Masonic order, possibly St. Andrews Lodge, and participated in all the anti-Crown protests.

Boston Tea Party
On December 16, 1773, members of the St. Andrew's Lodge and others boarded British vessels disguised as Indians, and threw shipments of tea into the harbor to protest the Tea Act. Thomas White was among the participants.

American Revolution
White returned to Pennsylvania, serving as soldier in the Continental Army in 2nd Pennsylvania Regiment in the American Revolution

Later years
Following the war, his family migrated west, settling in Huntingdon County, Pennsylvania. He built a farm and raised his children there, who numbered 21. Three of his sons served in the War of 1812; one of them, Ezekiel White, was captured at the Battle of Lundy's Lane, and died of dysentery at a prison camp. White was elected to the American Philosophical Society in 1787. He is buried in Bedford County, PA.

Monument
On July 4, 1899, members of patriot societies unveiled a monument in honor of White, located at the Evans Cemetery in Bedford County.

References

External links
Thomas White Family Website

1739 births
1820 deaths
18th-century Irish people
19th-century Irish people
People from County Kilkenny
Irish soldiers in the Continental Army
Patriots in the American Revolution
Kingdom of Ireland emigrants to the Thirteen Colonies
People from colonial Boston
People from Huntingdon County, Pennsylvania
People of colonial Massachusetts
Continental Army soldiers
Deaths from dysentery
Members of the American Philosophical Society